Daniel E. Innis (born April 7, 1963) is an American academic and politician. He served as a Republican State Senator, representing District 24 in the New Hampshire Senate from 2016-2018. He is also a professor of marketing and hospitality management at the University of New Hampshire. He served as the Dean of the Peter T. Paul College of Business and Economics at the University of New Hampshire from 2007 to 2013, overseeing major developments at the school.

Academic career
Prior to his tenure at the University of New Hampshire, Innis served as the dean of the College of Business, Public Policy and Health at the University of Maine in Orono. He also served Ohio University as the Associate Dean of the College of Business, Chair of the Marketing Department, and was a professor in the Marketing Department.

Political campaigns

Innis is a past finance chairman of the New Hampshire Republican Party.

2014

Innis was a Republican candidate in the 2014 election for the United States House of Representatives in New Hampshire for the 1st congressional district. He lost the primary to Frank Guinta, who went on to win the general election against Democratic incumbent Carol Shea-Porter.

2016

In October 2015, Innis announced he would again run for Congress in New Hampshire's 1st district. Before suspending his campaign, he was slated to face incumbent Frank Guinta and Jamieson Gradert in the Republican primary on September 13, 2016. Guinta was thought to be vulnerable due to a campaign finance controversy in which he accepted a campaign donation from his parents far exceeding the contribution limit for individuals.

In December 2015, Innis asked his supporters to make year-end contributions to a Manchester drug treatment center, Hope for New Hampshire, instead of to his campaign.

Innis suspended his congressional campaign in March 2016, citing family priorities and business interests.

On May 26, 2016, Innis announced he would be running for New Hampshire Senate District 24 which comprises the towns of Greenland, Hampton, Hampton Falls, Kensington, New Castle, North Hampton, Newton, Rye, Seabrook, Stratham and South Hampton. On September 13, 2016, Innis won the Republican nomination in a four-way race for State Senate in NH District 24. He beat Democratic State Rep. Tom Sherman for the seat in the general election on November 8.

2018
Sherman challenged Innis again in a rematch for the seat in the general election on November 6. This time, Innis was defeated.

Memberships
Innis is a member of Beta Gamma Sigma, Alpha Kappa Psi, the National Society of Collegiate Scholars, the American Marketing Association, the Academy of Marketing Science, the Association for Consumer Research, the Council of Logistics Management, and the American Psychological Association. Innis is a national board member of the Log Cabin Republicans. He is also a member of the New Hampshire Republican Party, the New Castle Historical Society, The Music Hall in Portsmouth, the New Castle Republican Town Committee, and the Rye New Hampshire Republicans.

Personal life
 He has three children; Emily, Nicholas and Benjamin, all of whom are UNH students or alumni.

Electoral history

References

External links
Campaign website

|-

1963 births
Gay politicians
Living people
Miami University alumni
Businesspeople from Columbus, Ohio
University of New Hampshire faculty
LGBT state legislators in New Hampshire
LGBT people from Ohio
Republican Party New Hampshire state senators
21st-century American politicians
Politicians from Columbus, Ohio
21st-century LGBT people